Wat Pradu Chimphli (also spelled: Wat Pradu Chimplee or Wat Pradoochimplee) is an ancient civilian Thai Buddhist temple in Wat Tha Phra Subdistrict, Bangkok Yai District, Bangkok's Thonburi side. The temple is situated rim Khlong Bangkok Yai, where is confluence of  khlongs (canal) Phasi Charoen, and Bangkok Yai.

The temple dates back to the reign of King Nangklao (Rama III) during early Rattanakosin period. It has the original name called "Wat Chimphli", derives from the many cotton trees (Bombax ceiba) that were found throughout this area (chimphli is cotton tree in Thai). But popular people called "Wat Pradu Nai" (วัดประดู่ใน; lit: inner Wat Pradu) in pair with nearby temple, Wat Pranu Nok (วัดประดู่นอก; outer  Wat Pradu) or Wat Pradu Nai Songtham in present day.

This temple was completed in the early reign of King Mongkut (Rama IV) by Phrasi Pipat Rachakosa (Tat Bunnag) as a project director, it took eight years to build. When completed it was said that it was the most beautiful  civilian temple at that time, especially the ordination hall, and principal Sukhothai Buddha image in Māravijaya attitude named "Luang Pho Sukothai Phraphuttha Samphanthamunee", with pagoda in the Mon style etc. 

Wat Pradu Chimphli is famous for Luang Pu Toh was the abbot during 1910s–1980s. He developed the temple in many ways and was a dedicated and merciful monk and highly respected by the local devotees including King Bhumibol Adulyadej (Rama IX). He was also famous for being the creator of Buddha amulets that called "Phra Pid Ta" (พระปิดตา; "eyes closed Buddha"). It is claimed to gives its owner great luck and protection and there is a saying that whoever owns a Luang Pu Toh amulet will be free from poverty.

References

Bangkok Yai district
Buddhist temples in Bangkok
Thai Theravada Buddhist temples and monasteries
Unregistered ancient monuments in Bangkok
19th-century Buddhist temples